FYK is a Norwegian sports car launched in 2006 designed to run on a mixture of hydrogen and natural gas. It was developed by Norwegian company Aetek with the backing of Statoil.

The car is designed to be a technology demonstrator and there are no plans to put it into series production.

The Aetek AS is hydrogen powered the FYK, may be similar.

See also
HCNG
Hynor

External links

Her er den norske Fyk-bilen
Nya norska racerbilen

Sports car manufacturers
Car manufacturers of Norway